Noah Igbinoghene (born November 27, 1999) is an American football cornerback for the Miami Dolphins of the National Football League (NFL). He played college football at Auburn and was drafted by the Dolphins in the first round of the 2020 NFL Draft.

Early life and high school career
Igbinoghene is of Nigerian descent, and lived in Nigeria for part of his life. Both of his parents, Festus Igbinoghene and Faith Igbinoghene, were Olympic athletes in track and field.

Igbinoghene attended Hewitt-Trussville High School in Trussville, Alabama. He played on the football team as a wide receiver. He committed to Auburn University to play college football. In addition to his football ability, he was a multiple state champion in track and field, claiming eight Alabama High School Athletic Association titles between the long jump and triple jump.

College career
Igbinoghene played at Auburn from 2017 to 2019. As a freshman he played wide receiver. Prior to 2018, he switched to cornerback. He became a starter that season and returned as a starter in 2019. After the 2019 season, he entered the 2020 NFL Draft. He finished his career with 92 tackles and one interception. He also had 2 kick return touchdowns in his career.

Professional career

Igbinoghene was drafted by the Miami Dolphins in the first round with the 30th overall pick in the 2020 NFL Draft. The Dolphins previously moved down from the draft selection they acquired in the trade that sent Kenny Stills and Laremy Tunsil to the Houston Texans. In his rookie season he played in all 16 games, and started 2.

On October 23, 2022 Igbinoghene secured a game-sealing interception in the waning seconds of a 16-10 victory against the Pittsburgh Steelers, the first of his career.

References

External links
Auburn Tigers bio

1999 births
Living people
American sportspeople of Nigerian descent
People from Trussville, Alabama
African-American players of American football
Nigerian players of American football
Players of American football from Alabama
American football cornerbacks
Auburn Tigers football players
Miami Dolphins players
21st-century African-American sportspeople